Mohammed Ali Jamin Rahman (born 28 February 2000) is an Indonesian professional footballer who plays as a midfielder for Qatar Stars League club Al-Gharafa.

Career statistics

Club

Notes

References

2000 births
Living people
Indonesian footballers
Indonesian expatriate footballers
Association football midfielders
Al-Gharafa SC players
Qatar Stars League players
Expatriate footballers in Qatar
Indonesian emigrants to Qatar